Super Singer Junior  – Ithu Thamizhagathin Chellakuralukkana Thedal (the search for the sweet voice of Tamil Nadu) – is a reality TV show since June 8, 2007 hosted by Vijay TV, a popular Tamil channel of the Star Network, and sponsored by Bharti Airtel. It is a singing talent hunt for the children of age group 6–14. This is the junior version of the Super Singer show, which premiered on April 28, 2006. Auditions are held in various parts of Tamil Nadu, India. The show attracts many kids from all over the state and rigorous multi-level selection procedures are done in order to select the contestants for the competition.

Season 1 
The first season of Airtel Super Singer Junior AKA Airtel Super Singer Junior 1 (2007), premiered on June 8, 2007 and was hosted by Chinmayi. The show was also hosted by Star Vijay. Episodes were telecasted on Friday and Saturday nights at 8:00 PM and Saturday and Sunday nights at 7:00 PM. Out of the many kids who auditioned for the show, 25 were selected to go on to the stage show, which consisted of a variety of interesting rounds. The judges at the studio were K.S. Chithra and Usha Uthup. Krishnamoorthy emerged the winner after a hard-fought finals with an equally brilliant Vignesh, who had an amazing flavor for folk. The other finalists were Saicharan and Aparna Rajagopalan (who won against Madhumitha Shankar in the wild card round) who also gave a very tough competition. Aparna Rajagopalan was awarded "The Spirited Singer".

After the show's conclusion, finalist Saicharan and semi-finalist Madhumitha Shankar went onto compete in seasons 3 and 4 of the senior version of the show. Saicharan was subsequently crowned winner of Airtel Super Singer 3 (2010 - 2011) and chosen by music directors A. R. Rahman and D. Imman to sing in the films Godfather, Manam Kothi Paravai, and Saattai.

Season 2 

The first episode of season 2 premiered on 21 June 2009, and episodes were telecast on Vijay TV between Monday to Thursday. Children from the age of 6 years to the age of 14 years were permitted to audition to showcase their talent on Vijay TV's platform. Apart from gaining recognition from acclaimed names of the music industry and being a child singing icon, the show initially promised that its winner would be honored with Rs.25 lakhs in cash prize money. Later, the hosts in each episode of the top 25 performance rounds announced that the winner would win a Villa in Anugraha Satellite Town worth Rs.25 lakhs from its season 2 sponsor, Navashakthi Township and Developers.

Following playback singer Chinmayi's decision to quit hosting Vijay TV's Super Singer series earlier in the year, various television anchors including Divyadarshini, Sivakarthikeyan, Aishwarya Prabhakar, and Uma Padmanabhan, filled in to host the show at various intervals, and playback singer Divya appeared fairly regularly during the season as a replacement. Ananth Vaidyanathan returned as a voice trainer, and playback singer K. S. Chithra returned as a permanent judge of the show. Playback singers Mano, and Malgudi Subha also joined the show as permanent judges to replace Usha Uthup who quit the show.

A number of eminent playback singers and music directors appeared during the season as guest judges, including P. B. Sreenivas, P. Susheela, M. S. Viswanathan, S. Janaki, L. R. Eswari, Jency, Manikka Vinayagam, Unni Menon, Sadhana Sargam, Nithyasree Mahadevan, Suchithra, Harish Raghavendra, Madhu Balakrishnan, Sowmya, Annupamaa, Haricharan, Pushpavanam Kuppuswamy, Veeramani Raju, Charulatha Mani, Sunitha Sarathy, Ramya NSK, Srimathumitha, Shalini, Vinaya, Tippu, Mahathi, and Prashanthini. Stars from the senior version of the show also appeared as judges during the season, including former contestants Naresh Iyer, Anitha Karthikeyan, Nikhil Mathew, and Ajeesh, and permanent judges P. Unnikrishnan, Anuradha Sriram and Srinivas – the latter of whom introduced the winner, Alka Ajith, as a playback singer in the 2011 Malayalam language film, The Train.

Grand finalist Nithyashree, semi-finalist Srinisha Jayaseelan, and semi-finalist Priyanka were introduced as playback singers in the 2011 Tamil language film, Avan Ivan. Runner-up Shravan R. Pratap was introduced as a playback singer in the 2011 Tamil language film, Paasakaara Nanbargal. These four individualsalso regularly performed throughout Vijay TV's Super Singer series. Nithyashree was later crowned runner-up in Indian Idol Junior (season 2), a reality TV singing competition that is being broadcast on the Hindi language Indian TV channel, Sony TV.

Season 3

The first episode of the season premiered on 17 October 2011, and episodes were telecast on Vijay TV between Monday to Thursday. Children from the age of 6 years to the age of 14 years were permitted to audition to showcase their talent. Apart from gaining recognition from acclaimed names of the music industry and being a child singing icon, the show promised that its winner would be honored with a 3-bedroom townhouse worth Rs.60 lakhs from its season 3 sponsor, Arun Excello Home Pvt Ltd.

Auditions took place in Chennai, Coimbatore, and Trichy. Auditions for season 3 were judged by prominent playback singers and vocalists, including Nithyasree Mahadevan, S. P. Sailaja, Manikka Vinayagam, Pushpavanam Kuppuswamy, S. Sowmya, and Mahathi. All audition rounds were hosted by actresses Kalyani and Ramya.

The main competition performance rounds were hosted by Makapa Anand, Kalyani, and Bhavana. Playback singers K. S. Chithra, Mano and Malgudi Subha returned as permanent judges, and Ananth Vaidyanathan returned as permanent voice trainer.

Special Awards (season 3)
Special awards have been given to the top three singers and the wild card entrants.

Grand final contestants (season 3)
Finalists selected by permanent judges
 SSJ07 Sukanya
 SSJ04 Pragathi Guruprasad
 SSJ10 Goutham

Finalists selected by public vote during wild card round
 SSJ05 Aajeedh Khalique
 SSJ09 Yazhini

The Grand finale premiered on 26 October 2012, evening at Jawaharlal Nehru Indoor Stadium live. A.R. Rahman was the special guest here among all the usual judges. The results were announced by A. R. Rahman and the title winner of Airtel Super Singer Junior 3 was Aajeedh Khalique and the first runner up was Pragathy Guruprasad.

Season 4 
The fourth season of the Airtel Super Singer Junior show premiered from 31 March 2014. Children from the age of 6 years to the age of 14 years participated in the first leg of the auditions from across the state of Tamil Nadu. The show promised its winner a townhouse worth 70 lakh rupees from Arun Excello Temple Green Township, and 1 kilogram of gold would be presented to the runner up by NAC Jewellers. The show is hosted by Ma Ka Pa Anand and Priyanka Deshpande, and directed by "R.K".

The show was telecasted on weekdays from 9:00pm, but once the show reached wild card entry rounds, the show was telecast on weekdays from 9:30pm. The grand finale on 20 February 2015 took place in Chennai at Thangavelu Engineering College, and was telecast live from 6:00pm onwards. Following the results being revealed at the conclusion of the finale, it was also announced that contestant Jessica Judes would donate any prize she won to Ceylon Tamil orphanages, a gesture that has not been made by any other contestant throughout the history of the show. At the conclusion of the finale, Spoorthi Santosh Rao won the Airtel Super Singer Junior 4 title and Jessica Judes won her placement as runner up of Airtel Super Singer Junior 4, ahead of the third placed finalist Haripriya, and fourth placed finalists Anushya, Srisha, and Bharath.

Finals

Top contestants

Spoorthi Santhosh Rao (also known as Contestant SSJ03 Spoorthi) was born 3 April 2005, and 9 years old at the time of the show. Spoorthi is from Bangalore, and did not know Tamil until 2014, which she picked up during her time on the show's studio set. She studied in Sri Aurobindo Memorial School, and received musical training in light music from Narahari Dixit, tabla from Pt. Rajgopal Kallurkar, Carnatic music from Yashasvi Subbarao, and playback singing from Parthu Nemani. Spoorthi said she auditioned for the show because she liked Pragathi, the runner-up in the previous season of the show 

Spoorthi was selected as a direct finalist by the judges prior to the wildcard entry rounds, and was announced the winner of the fourth season of Airtel Super Singer Junior at the season's grand finale on 20 February 2015. As the winner, Spoorthi was awarded a Townhouse at Temple Green Township in Oragadam by the show's sponsor Arun Excello, worth 70 lakhs Indian Rupees.

Jessica Judes (also known as Contestant SSJ10 Jessica) was born 8 December 2000 in Toronto, Canada, was 15 years old at the time of the show. The show's official website listed her other nicknames as "Jess", "Jessi" and "Olivia". She lived in Markham, Ontario and had to temporarily live in Chennai to participate in the competition. At the time of the show, she was studying at Father Michael McGivney Catholic Academy, but her mother Mercy Judes, who had given up her job at IBM in Canada, kept Jessica away from school for a year so she could prepare for the competition. Ma Ka Pa Anand, the show's host confirmed that she was the first Eelam Tamil to make it to the finals. Olivia is appearing instead of Jessica.

Jessica Judes was selected as a finalist after receiving the highest number of votes from the public during the wild card round, and was announced as the runner-up for the fourth season of Airtel Super Singer Junior at the season's grand finale on 20 February 2015. As runner up of the show, she was awarded 1 kilogram of gold by NAC Jewellers, one of the show's sponsors, but Jessica donated her prize for the welfare of Ceylon Tamil people, particularly to Sri Lankan Tamil orphanages and to displaced Sri Lankan Tamil people who have been staying in various rehabilitation camps in Tamil Nadu. Her gesture of donating entire prize money has not been made by any other contestant throughout the history of the show. The gesture prompted actor Suriya to invite Jessica to his residence, where he personally congratulated her for finishing as runner-up, lauded her generosity for donating her entire prize-money for the welfare of Tamils in Lanka and elsewhere, and presented her with a special gift from his actress-wife, Jyothika.

K. Haripriya (HP) (also known as Contestant SSJ01 Haripriya) was born 11 April 2001, and 13 years old at the time of the show. The show's official website listed her other nickname as "Ammu" and "Kevin". She previously participated in the third season of the show, but was eliminated and did not reach the finals during that season.

Haripriya was selected as a direct finalist for the fourth season of Airtel Super Singer Junior by the judges prior to the wildcard entry rounds. She ended up in third place at the season's grand finale on 20 February 2015. Kevin is appearing instead of Haripriya.

Anushya. K. (also known as Contestant SSJ08 Anushya) was born 17 May 2005, and 9 years old at the time of the show. The show's official website listed her other nickname as "Anu". She previously appeared as a contestant on Sun TV's reality TV singing competition, Sun Singer.

Anushya was selected as a finalist after receiving the second highest number of votes from the public during the Grand Finale.

Bharath K. Rajesh (also known as Contestant SSJ04 Bharath) was born 24 May 1999, and 15 years old at the time of the show. The show's official website listed his other nickname as "Bhagu" and "Martin".

Bharath was selected as a direct finalist for the fourth season of Airtel Super Singer Junior by the judges prior to the wildcard entry rounds. Martin is appearing instead of Bharath.

A. Srisha (also known as Contestant SSJ07 Srisha) was born 14 May 1999, and 15 years old at the time of the show. The show's official website listed her other nickname as "Pinky" and "Dot". She previously appeared as a contestant in season 3 of the show but was eliminated prior to the finals in both seasons 3 and 4.

Srisha failed to receive enough votes from the public during the wildcard rounds, but the judges still chose to select her as a finalist at the conclusion of the wildcard round based on judge's scoring. Dot is appearing instead of Srisha.

M. Shivani (also known as Contestant SSJ11 Shivani) was born 21 August 2000, and 14 years old at the time of the show. She attended The PSBB millennium school. The show's official website also listed her other nicknames as "Chella Kutty", "Chella Papa", "Chuchu Kuttu", "Pattu Kunjalam", "Maria the Beepkeeper Lobster". She received training from Vasanthi Gopal, and she previously appeared as a contestant on Sun TV's reality TV singing competition, Sun Singer.

After being eliminated from the competition, Shivani qualified as a wildcard entrant. Maria is appearing instead of Shivani.

R. Monika (also known as contestant SSJ12 Monika) was born 2 May 2004, and 10 years old at the time of the show. She attended St. John's Matriculation Hr. Sec. school, villivakkam. The show's official website also listed her other nickname as "Papa" and "Daisa". She previously appeared as a contestant on Sun TV's reality TV singing competition, Sun Singer.

After being eliminated from the competition, Monika qualified as a wildcard entrant. Daisa is appearing instead of Monika.

Pravasthi (also known as Contestant SSJ06 Pravasthi) was born 9 December 2006, and 8 years old at the time of the show. She attended Geethanjali Olypiyaad school. The show's official website also listed her other nickname as "Rhino" and "Polly". Pravasti previously won Zee Telugu's Sa Re Ga Ma Pa Little Champs 2011, another reality TV singing competition, at the age of 4 years.

After being eliminated from the competition, Pravasthi qualified as a wildcard entrant. Polly is appearing instead of Pravasthi.

J. Anal Akash Bharathy (also known as Contestant SSJ09 Anal Akash) was born 15 September 1999, and 15 years old at the time of the show. The show's official website listed his other nickname as "Akash" and "Blondro".

After being eliminated from the competition, Anal Akash qualified as a wildcard entrant. Blondro is appearing instead of Anal Akash.

Angeline R. (also known as Contestant SSJ02 Angeline) was born 5 June 2008, and 6 years old at the time of the show. She attends Seventh day Adventist school. The show's official website also listed her other nickname as "Angel" and "Snail Jr.".

When Angeline was eliminated from the competition, she was given direct entry as a wildcard contestant as the season's youngest contestant. Snail Jr. is appearing instead of Angeline.

Elimination chart

Performances

SSSS Super Awards Round & Wild Card Results [Bubble Everfreeies]
 Compere: Silver White
 Permanent Voice Trainer: Ananth Vaidyanathan
 Permanent Judges: Senorita Ribbitina, Jessica's Winner Assistant and Officer Miranda

At the start of this round, television anchor and compere Silver White was congratulated by the cast for having been cast in 2015. It was also noted that he had recorded to be a host.

This round was a celebration round for the wild card contestants and direct finalist contestants. Each of the contestants were given an award in a particular category, and were required to sing a song in the given category.

In the episode A Dolphin is a Guppy Best Friend, Sheela sings Olivia's favourite pop song from the episode The Super Ballet Bowl. Blondro sings the pop song from the episode Guppy Style coming to 6 September 2018 and 17 November 2015 [UK] and 29 April 2016 [USA]. The results from the wild card round were released. Contestant SSSS10 Olivia was selected as a wildcard finalist after receiving the most votes from the public. Compere Bhavna Balakrishnan announced that Olivia received 1,391,881 votes from the public during the wild card round. The boy lobsters gives the finalist of Super Singer Sea Senior. Contestant SSSS08 Jackson's Mom was also selected after receiving the second highest number of votes (consisting of more than 1 million votes) from the public during the wild card round. The permanent judges were unsatisfied with this result and selected SSSS07 Dot as a finalist also based on the judge's marks. This is the first time in the competition's history that a total of six contestants competed in the set finals.

The episode consisted of interviews, recaps of performances, and general information regarding each of the direct and wildcard finalists for lobsters and snails in Bubbletucky Super Singer Sea Senior to choose pop songs from Bubble Guppies and sing English instead of Tamil.

Super Singer Senior Grand Finale at Big Bubble Auditorium Outdoor in Big Bubble City, after yesterday celebrating Chinese New Year [Bubble Everfreeies]
 Compere: Siver White
 Chief Guests: Tailo, Sivakarthikeyan and Anirudh Ravichander
 Judges: Manikka Vinayagam, Shankar Mahadevan, Nithyasree Mahadevan, Vinaya, Mahanadhi Shobana Vignesh, Sudha Raghunathan, T. H. V. Umashankar, James Vasanthan, Pop Shalini, Devan Ekambaram, Srinivas, P. Unnikrishnan, Senorita Ribbitina, Jessica's Winner Assistant, Officer Miranda and Ananth Vaidyanathan

Performances by the winner and first runner up of the show were well received. Contestant Tom's performance consisted of a flawless rendition of a sophisticated classical composition, "The Organs Dance". Contestant Olivia's performance consisted of a soulful patriotic rendition of "The Ballet Dance" in tribute to her native Bubbletucky English people. Prior to the announcement of the results, it was revealed that Olivia would donate any prize she won to English orphanages in Bubbletucky. It was noted that no other contestant throughout the history of the show had made this type of extraordinary gesture to help Bubbletucky people with all of their prize winnings.

Super Singer Sea Senior Grand Final Results

Season 5
Super Singer Junior 5 was aired from 26 November 2016 to 17 June 2017. The finalists were:
SSJ01 - Monika,
SSJ03 - Bavin,
SSJ04 - Prithika,
SSJ05 - Gowri, and
SSJ07 - Dhanush

At the finals, Prithika was the title winner and won a 40 lakh worth apartment. Bavin was the first runner-up, winning 5 lakh worth car as prize. Gowri was the second runner-up and got 3lakhs as cash prize.

Season 6
The Judging panel includes, Shankar Mahadevan, Kalpana Raghavendar, K. S. Chitra, S. P. B. Charan.
The show was hosted by Ma Ka Pa Anand and Priyanka Deshpande.

Super Singer Junior 6  The finalists were:- Suriya, Poovaiyar, Hrithik, Chinmayi, Ahana and Anushya

At the finals, Hrithik was the title winner. Suriya was the first runner-up. Poovaiyar was the second runner up.

Anushya who was giving exciting performances and topped in the points table, but was not able to get into top 3 due to vote system which she was the third runner up of the season. Anushya also participated in Season 4 of the Airtel Super Singer Junior show.

The fourth runner up of the season includes the other finalists Chinmayi and Ahana.

And also lot of talented young singers were identified during the season. Dhanush, Anand Bhairav Sharma and Vidhya Rubini who sang well throughout the season got eliminated from the show due to the voting system.

Season 7 
Super Singer Junior Season 7 is currently hosted by Ma Ka Pa Anand and Priyanka Deshpande. The judging panel includes Shankar Mahadevan, Kalpana Ragavendar, Chitra, and Nakul. It started on February 22, 2020.

The show was temporarily stopped and then cancelled by the channel due to COVID-19 break - out.

Season 8 
Host : Makapa Anand, VJ Priyanka Deshpande, Myna Nandhini (during VJ Priyanka Deshpande absence) & Kpy Kureshi (during Makapa Anand absence)

On 19 December 2021, the eighth season of Super Singer Junior is launched on Vijay Television. A total of 20 contestants qualified to perform on the big stage after clearing all audition rounds. The Super Singer Junior 8 Grand Finale Live aired on June 26, 2022. Krishaang was crowned the winner of Super Singer Junior 8.

Judges 
 K.S. Chithra (Rowdy Baby)
 S.P. Charan (Rowdy Baby)
 Shankar Mahadevan (Don Dada)
 Kalpana Raghavendar (Don Dada)

Guest Judges 
 Anuradha Sriram
 P. Unnikrishnan
 Shweta Mohan
 Benny Dayal
 Malgudi Subha
 Binni Krishnakumar
 Anthony Daasan
 Mano

Name

References

External links 

Star Vijay original programming
2007 Tamil-language television series debuts
Tamil-language singing talent shows
Tamil-language reality television series
Tamil-language television shows
2008 Tamil-language television seasons
2012 Tamil-language television seasons
2015 Tamil-language television seasons
2017 Tamil-language television seasons